The FIU Panthers men's soccer team is an intercollegiate varsity sports team of Florida International University. As of the upcoming 2022 season, the team is a member of the NCAA Division I American Athletic Conference (The American).

History
FIU started their soccer program in 1972. They were unaffiliated from any collegiate organization until they joined the NCAA Division II from 1975 to 1986. During this time, FIU went to 11 NCAA Division II Tournaments where they won the national championships in 1982 and 1984 and runners up in 1980 and 1985.

Due to the success of their program in Division II, they became an NCAA Division I team in 1987. The team has represented FIU at 8 NCAA Division I Tournaments finishing runners up in 1996.

FIU's most recent conference change was announced during the 2021–22 offseason, when it left Conference USA (C-USA) for The American. The decision of the Sun Belt Conference to reinstate its men's soccer league effective with the 2022 season dropped the C-USA men's soccer membership to four (Charlotte, FIU, Florida Atlantic, UAB). Of these four schools, all but FIU (which remains a full C-USA member) were scheduled to move fully to The American in the near future, with a July 2023 entry date later confirmed. Accordingly, The American brought all four remaining C-USA men's soccer teams into its own soccer league. FIU will remain an affiliate of The American after the other three schools fully join that league.

Conferences
Throughout their history, the team has been part of several collegiate athletic conferences. They were members of the Trans America Athletic Conference (now known as the ASUN Conference) from 1991 to 1997 where they won the Conference Tournament in 1991. They joined the Atlantic Soccer Conference from 2000 to 2004 where they were Conference Regular Season Champions in 2000, 2002, 2003, and 2004. From 2005 to 2021, the team was a member of Conference USA, and it joined the American Athletic Conference in 2022.

Independent (1972–1990)
TAAC (1991–1997)
Independent (1998–1999)
ASC (2000–2004)
C-USA (2005–2021)
 The American (2022–present)

Roster

Coaching staff

Head coaches
 Dr. Greg Myers (1972–1974)
 Bill Nuttall (1975–1979)
 Karl Kremser (1980–2007)
 Munga Eketebi (2007–2011)
 Kenny Arena (2012–2013)
 Scott Calabrese (2014–2016)
 Kevin Nylen (2017–2020)
 Kyle Russell (2020–Present)

Notable alumni
 Robin Fraser
 Steve Ralston
 Jeff Cassar
 Greg Vanney
 Bobby Boswell
 Tyrone Marshall
 José Carlos Fernandez
 Sebastien Vorbe
 Juan Francisco Guerra

References

External links